Steve Costanzo (born 22 January 1988 in Ingham, Queensland) is an Australian professional basketball player who currently plays for the Townsville Heat in the Queensland Basketball League. At 18 years old, he earned himself a position at the Australian Institute of Sport. During this time he was acknowledged as having the largest every recorded wingspan. Costanzo played one game for the Townsville Crocodiles in 2008 2008-09 NBL season., before a foot injury forced him out for the rest of his career. Despite this set back, Costanzo did earn himself a Maccas Gold Card, guaranteeing him 50% discount on anything in the menu for life. He is also a valuable member of SMC.

References 

1988 births
Living people
Townsville Crocodiles players
Australian men's basketball players